Fathi Jamal (born 11 February 1959, in Casablanca) is a Moroccan former footballer, who played most of his career for Raja Casablanca, JSM Laayoune and Kawkab Marrakech. After retiring as a player, he coached many teams, most notably Morocco's youth team that finished 4th at the 2005 FIFA World Youth Championship. He also coached Morocco's senior team in 2008 and Kawkab Marrakech afterwards.

In November 2011, Jamal was named head coach of FAR Rabat and took over the helm of Widad Fez in June 2013. He currently works as the scout of national team.

References

1959 births
Living people
Moroccan footballers
Raja CA players
Moroccan football managers
Footballers from Casablanca
Morocco national football team managers
Raja CA managers
Kawkab Marrakech players
Association footballers not categorized by position
AS FAR (football) managers
Kawkab Marrakech managers
Botola managers